Alessandro Osso Armellino (born 5 May 1987) is an Italian footballer who plays for San Daniele.

Biography
Born in San Daniele del Friuli, the Province of Udine, Friuli sub-region, Osso made his first team debut on 16 March 2006, replacing Mirko Pieri in the last minute. The match Udinese was defeated by Levski Sofia 1–2 and was eliminated from 2005–06 UEFA Cup round of 16. He wore no.42 shirt that season. In the next season, he wore no.87 shirt. In 2007–08 season he changed to wear no.75.

In January 2008, he was loaned to Paganese along with Albin Hodza. He left for Celano in July 2008.

On 2 February 2009, he left for Colligiana in co-ownership deal. In June 2009, Colligiana acquired him outright, but he soon left for Serie D club Manzanese along with Udinese player Giovanni Barreca. After the relegation of the club, Alessandro Osso remained and play along with Andrea Osso.

In 2012–13 season he was a player of a local club in San Daniele del Friuli for the Eccellenza league (regional league). In 2013–14 season, Andrea re-joined Alessandro at San Daniele.

References

External links
 LaSerieD.com Profile 
 Lega Calcio Profile 
 Football.it Profile 

Italian footballers
Udinese Calcio players
Celano F.C. Marsica players
A.S.D. Olimpia Colligiana players
Serie C players
Association football midfielders
People from the Province of Udine
1987 births
Living people
Footballers from Friuli Venezia Giulia